"Let Yourself Go" is a song first recorded by Elvis Presley as part of the soundtrack for his 1968 motion picture Speedway.

In June 1968 it was released on a single with "Your Time Hasn't Come Yet, Baby" on the other side and on the soundtrack album Speedway.

On December 1, 1970, the single "Let Yourself Go" / "Your Time Hasn't Come Yet, Baby" was re-released as part of RCA Victor's Gold Standard Series (together with 9 other Presley's singles).

Writing and recording history 
The song was written by Joy Byers.

Presley recorded it on June 21, 1967, at the soundtrack recordings for the MGM movie Speedway (that took place June 20–21, 1967 at the MGM Studios in Hollywood, California.)

Track listings 
7" single (RCA 47–9547, 1968)	
 Let Yourself Go
 Your Time Hasn't Come Yet, Baby

7" single
 Your Time Hasn't Come Yet, Baby	
 Let Yourself Go

Charts

References

External links 
 Elvis Presley - Your Time Hasn't Come Yet, Baby / Let Yourself Go at Discogs

1968 songs
1968 singles
Elvis Presley songs
Songs written by Joy Byers
Songs written for films